TT Mobil İletişim Hizmetleri A.Ş, (previously Avea İletişim Hizmetleri A.Ş.), currently operating under the Türk Telekom brand, is the sole GSM 1800 mobile operator of Turkey, was founded in 2004, and has reached a nationwide customer base of 17 million as of September 30, 2015.

TT&TİM İletişim Hizmetleri A.Ş. was officially established on February 19, 2004 as a consequence of the merger between Aycell, Türk Telekom's GSM Operator and İş-TİM which has been established through the partnership of İş Bankası Group with a share of 51% and Telecom Italia Mobile with a share of 49%. Following the merger, for a period Aria and Aycell brands existed under TT&TİM. A totally new brand "Avea", reflecting the synergy from the merger was introduced into the market on June 23, 2004. The business name "TT&TİM İletişim Hizmetleri A.Ş" was replaced with "Avea İletişim Hizmetleri A.Ş." as of October 15, 2004.

The privatization of 55% of Türk Telekom's shares was completed in November 2005, by Oger Telecom's. In September 2006, Türk Telekom acquired Telecom Italia's shares of 40.6% in Avea. Turk Telekom's share is 81.37% in Avea. The remaining 18.63% of the shares belongs to İş Bankası.

On 27 January 2016, Türk Telekom decided to use single brand "Türk Telekom", for its mobile networking, landlines and internet service provider.

In June 2017, Avea presented a $450 million joint bid with Vodafone Turkey to provide mobile communications infrastructure in areas where these infrastructures are still lacking.

The Name "Avea" 

"Avea" is a derived name from the names of merged two operators, which are "Aycell" and "Aria". That is "Avea" is a combination of first letters of names of two merged operators. "A" "ve" "A" in Turkish, which means "A" "and" "A".

Coverage area 
The merging of two GSM operators has resulted in the need of redesigning the network architecture to extend coverage and to solve the issues created by the network load. Avea has been able to complete most of that process about one year after its creation, and currently covers a vast majority of Turkey's land area with more than 7000 base stations (A map can be found on The GSM World Web Page). Offering services to 97.4% of Turkey's population through its next generation network, the company is growing fast both in the corporate and individual services with the brand "Avea" and constantly investing in technology and infrastructure as well as in its management and more than 2,700 employees. Having roaming agreements with 656 operators in 201 countries, the company continues to expand its roaming partnerships.

Being a merger of two networks, Avea suffers from the heterogeneity of roaming partners and customers with numbers beginning with 50 and 55 don't have the same list of roaming partners (see the list of roaming partners for 505 customers and the list of roaming partners for 555 customers for the different partners' lists). Avea also offers GPRS / EDGE / 3G roaming in multiple countries (see the list of GPRS roaming partners for 505 customers and the list of GPRS roaming partners for 555 customers).

Competitiveness 
As the latest participant in the Turkish GSM sector, Aria, Aycell and Avea have been obliged to offer lower prices to attract a maximum number of customers. Consequently, Turkcell (the leader of the Turkish GSM market) has lowered down its intra-network call rates by a third after the creation of Aria, and halved all call rates when Avea has been launched.

See also 
 List of companies of Turkey

References 

 Avea

Turkish companies established in 2004
Companies based in Istanbul
Turkish brands
Telecommunications companies established in 2004
Telecommunications companies of Turkey